The Monte Carlo Rally or Rallye Monte-Carlo (officially Rallye Automobile de Monte-Carlo) is a rallying event organized each year by the Automobile Club de Monaco. From its inception in 1911 by Prince Albert I, the rally was intended to demonstrate improvements and innovations in automobiles, and promote Monaco as a tourist resort on the Mediterranean shore. Before the format changed in 1997, the event was a “concentration rally” in which competitors would set off from various starting points around Europe and drive to Monaco, where the rally would continue to a set of special stages. The rally now takes place along the French Riviera in Monaco and southeast France.



History

1911 beginnings and controversy
In 1909 the Automobile Club de Monaco (Sport Automobile Velocipédique Monégasque) started planning a car rally at the behest of Albert I, Prince of Monaco. The Monte Carlo Rally was to start at points all over Europe and converge on Monte Carlo. In January 1911 23 cars set out from 11 different locations and Henri Rougier was among the nine who left Paris to cover a  route. The event was won by Rougier in a Turcat-Méry 25 Hp. The rally comprised both driving and then somewhat arbitrary judging based on the elegance of the car, passenger comfort and the condition in which it arrived in the principality. The outcry of scandal when the results were published changed nothing, so Rougier was proclaimed the first winner.

Following the Second World War, works or works-supported teams became more and more important. From 1949 onwards, there was a special Team prize. First winners were the three Allards of Potter, Godsall and Imhof. Simca, Delahaye, Sunbeam-Talbot, Jaguar were subsequent winners. Sydney Allard – as the first and only winner driving his own car – was driving a "works" car in 1952, but Gatsonides also participated in a factory prepared Ford Zephyr in 1953, a year that saw no fewer than eight factory backed Sunbeam-Talbots.

1966 controversy
The 1966 event was the most controversial in the history of the Rally. The first four finishers, driving three Mini-Coopers, Timo Mäkinen, Rauno Aaltonen and Paddy Hopkirk, and Roger Clark's 4th-placed Ford Cortina were all disqualified because they used non-dipping single filament quartz iodine bulbs in their headlamps, in place of the standard double filament dipping glass bulbs, which are fitted to the series production version of each models sold to the public. This elevated Pauli Toivonen (Citroën ID) into first place overall. Rosemary Smith (Hillman Imp) was also disqualified from sixth place, after winning the Coupe des Dames, the ladies' class. In all, ten cars were disqualified. Teams threatened to boycott the event. The headline in Motor Sport read "The Monte Carlo Fiasco".

Recent history 
From 1973 to 2008 the rally was held in January as the first event of the FIA World Rally Championship, but between 2009 to 2011 it has been the opening round of the Intercontinental Rally Challenge (IRC) programme, a championship for N/A 4WD cars, before returning to the WRC championship season again in 2012. As recently as 1991, competitors were able to choose their starting points from approximately five venues roughly equidistant from Monte Carlo (one of Monaco's administrative areas) itself.

With often varying conditions at each starting point (typically comprising dry tarmac, wet tarmac, snow, and ice, sometimes all in a single stage of the rally), this event places a big emphasis on tyre choices, as a driver has to balance the need for grip on ice and snow with the need for grip on dry tarmac. For the driver, this is often a difficult choice as the tyres that work well on snow and ice normally perform badly on dry tarmac.

The Automobile Club de Monaco confirmed on 19 July 2010 that the 79th Monte-Carlo Rally would form the opening round of the new Intercontinental Rally Challenge season. To mark the centenary event, the Automobile Club de Monaco has also confirmed that Glasgow, Barcelona, Warsaw and Marrakesh have been selected as start points for the rally.

Col de Turini
This rally features one of the most famous special stages in the world. The stage is run from La Bollène-Vésubie to Sospel, or the other way around, over a steep and tight mountain road with many hairpin turns. On this 31 km route it passes over the Col de Turini, a mountain pass road which normally has ice and/or snow on sections of it at that time of the year. Spectators also throw snow on the road—in 2005, Marcus Grönholm and Petter Solberg both ripped a wheel off their cars when they skidded on snow probably placed there by spectators, and crashed into a wall. Grönholm went on to finish fifth, but Solberg was forced to retire as the damage to his car was extensive. In the same event, Sébastien Loeb set one of the fastest times in the modern era, with 21 minutes 40 seconds.

Sospel has an elevation of 479m, and the D70 has a maximum elevation of 1603m, for an average gradient of 6.7%. The Turini is also driven at night, with thousands of fans watching the "Night of Turini", also known as the "Night of the Long Knives" due to the strong high beam lights cutting through the night. In the 2007 edition of the rally, the Turini was not used, but it returned for the 2008 route. For both the 2009 and 2010 event the stage was run at night and shown live on Eurosport.

The event as part of FIA Championships: ERC, WRC and IRC 

From its introduction in 1953 to 1972 the Rallye was part of the European Rally Championship, except in 1968 and 1969. From 1973 to 2008 the rally was held in January as the first event of the FIA World Rally Championship, but between 2009 to 2011 it has been the opening round of the Intercontinental Rally Challenge (IRC) programme, a championship for N/A 4WD cars, before returning to the WRC championship season again in 2012. As recently as 1991, competitors were able to choose their starting points from approximately five venues roughly equidistant from Monte Carlo (one of Monaco's administrative areas) itself.

Past winners of the event, including second and third places

1911–1972

1973–1985

1986–1999

2000–2009

2010–2019

2020– 

† – Event was shortened after stages were cancelled.

Multiple winners
Year in italic was not WRC event

See also
Monte Carlo or Bust!
Herbie Goes to Monte Carlo
  EWRC.com shows many of the results
  Further reading: 1911-1980 Monte Carlo Rally - The Golden Age, by Graham Robson (2007)

Notes

External links 

 

 
Monte Carlo
Sport in Monte Carlo
Motorsport in Monaco
Sports competitions in Monaco
Winter events in Monaco
Recurring sporting events established in 1911
World Rally Championship rallies
January sporting events